Astrobiology Magazine (exploring the solar system and beyond), or Astrobiology Mag, was an American, formerly NASA-sponsored, international online popular science magazine that contained popular science content, which referred to articles for the general reader on science and technology subjects. The magazine reported on missions of NASA and other space agencies, as well as presents news of relevant research conducted by various institutions, universities, and non-profit groups. In addition, the magazine provided a forum through which researchers and the general public could oversee the progress made in fields of study that were associated with the science of astrobiology. The magazine was created by Helen Matsos, who was the chief editor and executive producer. It began publication in 1999 and as of 2021 is now offline.

See also 

 Abiogenesis
 Astrobiology journal
 Astronomy
 Discover
 Earliest known life forms
 National Geographic
 Popular Science
 Scientific American
 Sky & Telescope

References

External links
 

Online magazines published in the United States
Science and technology magazines published in the United States
NASA
Popular science magazines
Magazines established in 1999
1999 establishments in the United States